Nepalese Americans are Americans of Nepalese ancestry. Immigration from Nepal to the United States began in the 20th century, and many have been able to establish themselves as American nationals. The history of immigration from Nepal to America is more recent in comparison to other South Asian ethnic groups. Major community groups of Nepali Americans consists of Khas, followed by minority Newars, Tharus, Tamangs, Gurungs, Limbus, Rais, Magar, Madhesis, Lhotshampas, and others, as of American Nepalese Convention Survey of 2018.

History
Nepali Americans began migrating to the United States in the early 20th century.
The first Nepalese immigrants to enter the United States were classified as "other Asian". Nepalese Americans were first classified as a separate ethnic group in 1974 when 56 Nepalese people had immigrated to the United States. The number of immigrants from Nepal remained below 100 per year until 1992.

According to the 1990 U.S. Census, there were 2,616 Americans with Nepalese ancestry. Fewer than 100 Nepalese immigrants became U.S. citizens each year, but the number of Nepalese who become legal residents had grown steadily from 78 in 1987 to 431 in 1996. The Nepalese community experienced significant growth in population during the 2000s. The poor political and economic conditions caused by the Nepalese Civil War marked increased emigration from Nepal. Now, significant communities of Nepali-Americans exist in large metropolitan areas such as Texas, New York City, Boston, Chicago, Denver, Gainesville, Florida, Portland, Oregon, and Saint Paul, Minnesota. Sizable numbers also live in various cities of California, such as Artesia (1.2% Nepalese American) and Sonoma (0.6%). Gradually, this community has been integrating into mainstream politics. Harry Bhandari became the first Nepalese American to be elected to public office when he won a State Delegate race in Maryland in 2018. Bhandari beat an incumbent and has become the first minority to win any election in the history of the majority White American district.

Communities in the United States
As of 2010, the largest communities of Nepalese were in the following cities:
New York, NY - 60,000 (0.07% of total populace)
Columbus, OH - 20,000 (0.96% of total populace)
Sonoma, CA - 2,352 (0.06% of total populace)
Irving, TX - 1,507 (0.6% of total populace)
Houston - 833 (0.03% of total populace)
Somerville, MA - 752 (1.0% of total populace)
Chicago - 534 (0.02% of total populace)
Fort Worth, TX - 502 (0.07% of total populace)
Arlington, VA - 473 (0.2% of total populace)
Denver, CO - 413 (0.04% of total populace)
Aurora, CO - 362 (0.1% of total populace)

According to estimates from the American Community Survey for 2015-2019, there were 140,900 Nepalese immigrants in the USA. of that number, the top counties of settlement were as follows:

1) Queens Borough, NY -------------------------- 8,100

2) Tarrant County, TX ----------------------------- 6,300

3) Dallas County, TX ------------------------------- 4,900

4) Middlesex County, Mass -------------------  3,500

5) Fairfax County, VA ----------------------------- 3,400

6) Harris County, TX ------------------------------ 2,900

7) Los Angeles County, CA -------------------- 2,600

8) Contra Costa County, CA ------------------ 2,500

9) Baltimore County, MD ----------------------- 2,400

10) Franklin County, OH ------------------------ 2,300

11) Alameda County, CA ----------------------- 2,100

12) Summit County, OH ------------------------ 2,000

13) Santa Clara County, CA ------------------ 2,000

14) Orange County, CA ------------------------- 1,800

15) Montgomery County, MD --------------- 1,800

16) Prince William County, VA -------------- 1,700

17) King County, WA ---------------------------- 1,600

18) Wake County, N.C. ------------------------- 1,500

19) DeKalb County,  GA ------------------------ 1,500

20) Cook County, Illinois ---------------------- 1,500

21) Mecklenburg County, N.C. ------------- 1,400

22) Douglas County, NEB ---------------------- 1,400

23) Salt Lake County, UT ----------------------- 1,300

24) Hillsborough County, NH ----------------- 1,300

25) Dauphin County, PA ------------------------- 1,300

Ethnic Nepali Bhutanese American 

Bhutanese refugees are the group of people of Nepali origin who were expelled from Bhutan and temporarily settled in various refugee camps in the eastern parts of Nepal.  Since 2008, many Bhutanese refugees have been resettled in different parts of the world and the U.S. There are 96,581 Bhutanese refugees in the U.S alone. As many Bhutanese came to the U.S. from Nepal as political refugees from that country and are registered as Nepalese Americans; often leading to the actual numbers of Bhutanese Americans being underreported

Cultural celebrations 
From the mid-1980s, the Nepalese community in the United States began to develop a series of social, cultural and charitable networks, which include the celebration of certain religious and cultural moments as Sakela, Losar, Dasain, Tihar, Chhath and the Nepali New Year. They also participated in local cultural events such as Pacific Rogers and Park Fest interfaith community festivals.

Community and economic issues

Poverty
According to data collected by the Pew Research Center, Nepali American median household income in 2019 was $55,000 a year, significantly less than the $85,800 median of all Asians and the $68,000 of all Americans. Further demonstrating the economic deprivation of Nepali Americans, 17 percent of them are at poverty or lower, significantly higher than the 10 percent of Asians at poverty or lower and the 11 percent of all Americans at poverty or lower.

Notable people

See also

 List of Nepal-related topics
 Nepal
 Nepalese Canadians
 Nepalese Australians
 Nepalis in the United Kingdom
 Bhutanese Americans
 Nepal–United States relations

References

Further reading
 Miller, Olivia. "Nepalese Americans." Gale Encyclopedia of Multicultural America, edited by Thomas Riggs, (3rd ed., vol. 3, Gale, 2014), pp. 277-288. Online
 Mishra, P. B. “Nepalese Migrants in the United States of America: Perspectives on Their Exodus, Assimilation Pattern and Commitment to Nepal.” Journal of Ethnic and Migration Studies 37#9 (2011): 1527–37.

External links
  Nepal Study Center, University of New Mexico
 Embassy of Nepal in U.S.A.
 Nepalese American: Facts and Statistics

Asian-American society
 American people of Nepalese descent
 Nepalese American
American
 South Asian American